Laura Heyrman (born 17 May 1993) is a Belgian volleyball player. She is a member of the Belgium women's national volleyball team.

Career
She was part of the Belgian national team at the 2014 FIVB Volleyball Women's World Championship in Italy. She was selected to play the Italian League All-Star game in 2017.

Clubs
  Asterix Kieldrecht (2009–2011)
  Dresdner SC (2012–2013)
  Liu Jo Modena (2013–2016)
  Liu Jo Nordmeccanica Modena (2016–2018)
  Hitachi Rivale (2018–2019)
  Saugella Team Monza (2019–2021)
  Eczacıbaşı VitrA (2021–Present)

Awards

Clubs
 2009-10 Belgian Championship –  Champion, with Asterix Kieldrecht
 2010 Belgian Supercup –  Champion, with Asterix Kieldrecht
 2010-11 Belgian Championship –  Champion, with Asterix Kieldrecht
 2010-11 Belgian Cup –  Champion, with Asterix Kieldrecht
 2011-12 Belgian Championship –  Champion, with Asterix Kieldrecht
 2011-12 Belgian Cup –  Champion, with Asterix Kieldrecht
 2012-13 German Championship –  Runner-Up, with Dresdner SC
 2014-15 Italian Cup –  Runner-Up, with Liu Jo Modena
 2016-17 Italian Cup –  Runner-Up, with Liu Jo Nordmeccanica Modena
 2016-17 Italian Championship –  Runner-Up, with Liu Jo Nordmeccanica Modena

National team

Youth team
 CEV U18 European Championship -  Gold Medal
 FIVB U18 World Championship -  Bronze Medal

References

External links
 Italian League Profile

1993 births
Living people
Belgian women's volleyball players
Place of birth missing (living people)
Volleyball players at the 2010 Summer Youth Olympics
Volleyball players at the 2015 European Games
European Games competitors for Belgium
Middle blockers
Youth Olympic gold medalists for Belgium
People from Beveren
Sportspeople from East Flanders
21st-century Belgian women